Enga Paappa is a 1966 Indian Tamil-language drama film produced and directed by B. R. Panthulu. The film stars Baby Shakila, M. V. Rajamma, Ravichandran and Bharathi. It was released on 8 July 1966.

Plot

Cast 
Adapted from The Hindu:
 Baby Shakila as Mangalam
 M. V. Rajamma as Mangalam's aunt
 Ravichandran as Mangalam's brother
 Master Sridhar portrays the younger version of the character
 O. A. K. Thevar as Ravichandran's friend
 Bharathi as Ravichandran's wife
 Nagesh
 K. A. Thangavelu
 Manorama

Production 
Enga Paappa was produced and directed by B. R. Panthulu under his own company Padmini Pictures, while Dada Mirasi wrote the story and Ma. Ra wrote the dialogues. The cinematography was handled by V. Ramamurthy, and the editing by R. Devarajan edited the film. Audiography was handled by T. N. Rangaswami, and Thangappan for choreography. Shooting took place at Vauhini Studios.

Soundtrack 
The music of the film was composed by M. S. Viswanathan, with lyrics by Kannadasan. One of the songs, "Naan Pottal Theriyum", attained popularity.

Release and reception 
Enga Paappa was released on 8 July 1966. The film attained popularity due to its unconventional storyline, and Shakila's portrayal of Mangalam was well-received by viewers. It was also a commercial success. However, Kalki wrote that while the film was trying to please everyone, it was not heart touching.

References

External links 
 

1960s Tamil-language films
1966 drama films
Films directed by B. R. Panthulu
Films scored by M. S. Viswanathan
Indian drama films